Patricia Joy Harmon or Joy Patricia Harmon (born May 1, 1940) is an American baker and former actress.

Early years

The daughter of Homer Harmon, Joy Patricia Harmon was born in Jackson Heights, New York, or Flushing, New York. She and her family moved to Connecticut in 1946. She was a Miss Connecticut, She tied for fourth runner-up in the 1957 competition for Miss Connecticut.

When she was three years old, Harmon modeled clothes in Fox Movietone News newsreels. She skipped two grades in elementary school and graduated from Staples High School in Westport, Connecticut.

Career
Harmon's stage debut came in Pajama Tops at the Klein Memorial Theatre in Bridgeport, Connecticut. She toured the United States in stock company productions, including The Marriage-Go-Round, The Solid Gold Cadillac, The Tender Trap, The Importance of Being Ernest, and Susan Slept Here. On Broadway, Harmon portrayed Betty Phillips in Make a Million (1958). She also appeared in an off-Broadway production of Susan Slept Here (1961).

Harmon was a contestant during the last season of Groucho Marx's television program You Bet Your Life (titled The Groucho Show during its last season), and later a regular on Marx's program Tell It to Groucho (credited as "Patty Harmon"). She guest-starred on several 1960s TV series, including Gidget, Batman, and The Monkees. She appeared in a cameo role as blonde Ardice in the Jack Lemmon comedy Under the Yum Yum Tree in 1963. She had a role as Tony Dow's girlfriend in the 1965–66 television soap opera Never Too Young.

Harmon's stand-out acting roles include the 30-foot-tall (9 m) Merrie in Village of the Giants (1965, in which she captures normal-sized Johnny Crawford and suspends him from her bikini top), and the car-washing Lucille in Cool Hand Luke (1967) with her purportedly 41–22–36 measurements.

Personal life
Harmon was married to film editor and producer Jeff Gourson from 1968 to 2001, raising three children. For a time, a son worked at Walt Disney Studios. She later established a bakery, Aunt Joy's Cakes, in Burbank, California.

Filmography

Films roles
The Man in the Gray Flannel Suit (1956) - Minor Role (uncredited)
Let's Rock (1958) - Pickup Girl
Mad Dog Coll (1961) - Caroline
Under the Yum Yum Tree (1963) - Ardice (uncredited)
Roustabout (1964) - College Girl (uncredited)
Young Dillinger (1965) - Nelson's Girl
One Way Wahine (1965) - Kit Williams
The Loved One (1965) - Miss Benson (uncredited)
Village of the Giants (1965) - Merrie
A Guide for the Married Man (1967) - Party Girl in Bar (uncredited)
Cool Hand Luke (1967) - Lucille, The Girl
Angel in My Pocket (1969) - Miss Holland

Television roles
The Beverly Hillbillies (1963) - Kitty
My Three Sons (1964) - Joanne Grant
Burke's Law (1964-1965) - Barbara Sue / Belle Sue Walsh
Gidget (1965) - Blonde Girl Dancing / Midge (uncredited)
Batman (1966) - Julia Davis (uncredited)
Gomer Pyle, U.S.M.C. (1966) - Barbara
Bewitched (1966) - Francie
The Rounders (1966) - Rosetta
Occasional Wife (1967) - Model
That Girl (1967) - Miss Bridges
The Monkees (1967) - Zelda / Cashier
Love, American Style (1972) - Rosalie (segment "Love and the Secret Habit")
The Odd Couple (1972) - Waitress
Thicker Than Water (1973) - (final appearance)

References

External links
 

American film actresses
American television actresses
1940 births
Living people
American bakers
American beauty pageant contestants
Actresses from New York City
Actresses from Connecticut
21st-century American women
American stage actresses
Broadway theatre people